Carol Palmer is a British anthropologist, environmental archaeologist and botanist. She is currently Director of the British Institute in Amman, an Honorary Fellow at Bournemouth University, and a part of the Thimar collective. Her primary research interests are in rural societies in the Arab world, changes in the practices of food production on the landscape and in society, and ethnobotany. She collaborates as Project Partner of the INEA project, which aims to examine archaeological site usage using phytolithic and geochemical evidence. She has also been a part of the Antikythera Survey Project and the Wadi Faynan Landscape Survey, and from 2001-2004 served as secretary of the Association of Environmental Archaeology.

In 2010, Palmer won the Society for Medieval Archaeology's Martyn Jope Award for "the best novel interpretation, application of analytical method or presentation of new findings" published in that year's volume of Medieval Archaeology along with co-authors Christopher Knüsel, Catherine M. Batt, Gordon Cook, Janet Montgomery, Gundula Müldner, Alan R. Ogden, Ben Stern, John Todd, and Andrew S Wilson.

Education 
Carol Palmer completed her PhD at the University of Sheffield in 1998 under Prof. Glynis Jones. Her dissertation was entitled "Crop husbandry practices in the Mediterranean zone and their implications for ancient agriculture". She undertook postdoctoral research as a Council of British Research in the Levant Postdoctoral Fellowship at the University of Leicester and was a postdoctoral research fellow at the University of Sheffield.

Selected publications

References 

British women archaeologists
British women botanists
Living people
Year of birth missing (living people)
Alumni of the University of Sheffield